The 2011 Elite League speedway season (also known as the Sky Sports Elite League for sponsorship reasons) was the 77th season of the top division of UK speedway and took place between 26 March and 20 October 2011. The Coventry Bees were the defending champions after winning in 2010.

Summary
It was a great season for the Poole Pirates, who won the Elite League, the Pairs Championship and the Knockout Cup. Claiming a clean sweep of honours. Throughout the 2010 season, it was rumoured that the Ipswich Witches would prefer to compete in the Premier League from 2011 onwards. Although they survived the promotion/relegation battle with the Newcastle Diamonds, it was decided that they would swap divisions with the Birmingham Brummies. On 27 November 2010, The BSPA announced that both Coventry Bees and Peterborough Panthers would not be riding in the top flight after they failed to declare their intent to compete in the 2011 competition. This then led to the King's Lynn Stars being promoted from the Premier League due to the Elite League needing a minimum of 8 teams. On 15 March 2011 it was announced that both the Coventry Bees and Peterborough Panthers would be part of the 2011 Elite League after all.

Poole Pirates made up for the previous season's disappointment by winning the league and cup double. The Australian quartet of Darcy Ward, Chris Holder, Davey Watt and Jason Doyle were supported well by Swedes Thomas H. Jonasson and Dennis Andersson as the Poole team deservedly won the title after finishing top of the regular season table for the second consecutive year. The Australian domination also extended to the league averages, which were topped by Chris Holder and the Elite League Riders' Championship won by Rory Schlein of Belle Vue.

League table

Home: 3W = Home win by 7 points or more; 2W = Home win by between 1 and 6 points 
Away: 4W = Away win by 7 points or more; 3W = Away win by between 1 and 6 points; 1L = Away loss by 6 points or less
M = Meetings; D = Draws; L = Losses; F = Race points for; A = Race points against; +/- = Race points difference; Pts = Total Points

Championship play-offs

Semi-finals
Leg 1

Leg 2

Grand final
First leg

Second leg

Poole Pirates were declared Elite League Champions, on winning on aggregate 98-85.

Elite League Knockout Cup
The 2011 Elite League Knockout Cup was the 73rd edition of the Knockout Cup for tier one teams. Poole Pirates were the winners of the competition for the second successive year.

First round

Quarter-finals

Semi-finals

Final
First leg

Second leg

The Poole Pirates were declared Knockout Cup Champions, winning on aggregate 102-86.

Leading averages

Riders & final averages
Belle Vue

 9.10
 8.56
 7.70
 6.48
 5.70
 5.60
 5.22
 4.65
 4.48
 3.30
 2.00

Birmingham

 7.65
 7.46
 6.84
 6.52
 6.16
 5.73
 5.39
 5.33
 5.10

Coventry

 8.77
 8.28
 7.96
 6.95
 6.76
 6.06
 5.57
 4.21
 3.88

Eastbourne

 8.61
 7.92
 7.75 
 7.69 
 7.22 
 7.19
  3.06

King's Lynn

 9.22
 8.03
 7.88
 7.30
 6.11
 4.48
 4.04
 4.00

Lakeside

 8.46
 7.52
 7.48
 7.26
 6.99
 6.52
 6.35
 6.02
 5.67
 4.21

Peterborough

 9.20 
 8.84
 7.83
 6.82
 6.02
 4.47
 4.00
 3.87

Poole

 10.05 
 9.99 
 7.93
 7.14
 6.41
 6.23
 6.10
 5.62
 4.84
 1.74

Swindon

 7.78
 7.02
 6.86
 6.72
 6.19
 4.89
 3.63
 2.83

Wolverhampton

 9.66
 8.78
 8.34
 5.76
 4.56
 4.43
 2.73

See also
 List of United Kingdom Speedway League Champions
 Knockout Cup (speedway)

References

SGB Premiership
Elite League
Speedway